The 2010–11 South Carolina Gamecocks men's basketball team represented the University of South Carolina in the 2010-11 college basketball season. Their head coach was Darrin Horn, in his third season with the Gamecocks. The team played its home games at the Colonial Life Arena in Columbia, South Carolina, as a member of the Southeastern Conference.

Previous season
The Gamecocks finished the 2009–10 season 15–16 overall, 6–10 in SEC play and lost in the first round of the SEC tournament to Alabama.

Roster

Schedule and results

|-
!colspan=9 style=| Non-conference regular season

|-
!colspan=9 style=| SEC regular season

|-
!colspan=9 style=| SEC tournament

|-

References

South Carolina Gamecocks
South Carolina Gamecocks men's basketball seasons
Game
Game